The Watson, later Kay Baronetcy, of East Sheen in the County of Surrey, was a title in the Baronetage of the United Kingdom. It was created on 5 December 1803 for the merchant and soldier Brook Watson, with remainder failing male issue of his own to his great-nephews William Kay and Brook Kay and the male issue of their bodies. Watson died unmarried and was succeeded according to the special remainder by his great-nephew William Kay, the third Baronet. The title became extinct on the death of the sixth Baronet in 1918.

Watson, later Kay baronets, of East Sheen (1803)
Sir Brook Watson, 1st Baronet (died 1807)
Sir William Kay, 2nd Baronet (died 1850)
Sir Brook Kay, 3rd Baronet (1780–1866)
Sir Brook Kay, 4th Baronet (1820–1907)
Sir William Algernon Kay, 5th Baronet (1837–1914)
Sir William Algernon Ireland Kay, 6th Baronet (1876–1918)

References

East Sheen
Extinct baronetcies in the Baronetage of the United Kingdom
Baronetcies created with special remainders